Danielle "Danz" Johnson (born February 20, 1989), known professionally as Danz CM and formerly Computer Magic, is an American musician and producer based in New York City. She is a singer, songwriter, composer, music producer, DJ, and the founder of the music project Synth History and the indie record label Channel 9 Records. She also composes music for commercials, especially for Japanese brands.

From 2010 until mid 2020, Johnson used the moniker Computer Magic, a name derived from a quote by Viv Savage in This Is Spinal Tap: "quite exciting this computer magic!". In August 2020, she announced that she changed her moniker to Danz CM.

According to Allmusic, her music is "spacy, sci-fi-influenced synth pop". Johnson released 3 studio albums (Davos in 2015, Danz in 2018 and The Absurdity of Human Existence in 2021), 2 compilations (Super Rare in 2017, COVERS 2010–20 in 2020), a string of EPs and singles, plus Japan edition albums.

Life and career

Early life and beginnings 
Johnson was born in Rock Hill, New York and raised in both Rock Hill and Woodridge in the Catskill Mountains area. At the age of 15 she started music blogging. She maintained a music blog named Mewzick from November 2006 until January 2009. From July 2009 until July 2016 she blogged on her site zDanz.

At the age of 18, she moved to New York City to attend Hunter College and became a DJ at places such as the Tribeca Grand Hotel (now The Roxy Hotel) and Ruff Club at The Annex. According to Johnson, she was a "pretty terrible student", trying to afford rent and the expensive city living by working late nights at a restaurant and DJing. She was withdrawn from all her classes.

Career as Computer Magic (2010–2020) 

In 2010 at the age of 21, Johnson moved in with her mother who had relocated to Florida. Unsure what she wanted to do career-wise, she applied for many jobs but couldn't get one. In her downtime, she downloaded the DAW Ableton Live and learned on her own how to make music. One of the first songs she completed was "Running", done in a closet on a laptop with a cheap microphone. She reminisced about her first attempts at making music: "I remember showing my mom the music I made and she was like 'How did you do this?' I just thought everyone could write music. I didn't know anything I did was special. It was kind of hard for me to believe. It was like a lightbulb went off after that. I would just make one song after the next and put it up online. And I realized – geez, maybe this is what I was meant to do all along."

She picked the moniker Computer Magic, a name derived from a quote by Viv Savage in This Is Spinal Tap: "quite exciting this computer magic!". Talking about her moniker, Johnson said: "In the beginning I didn't know what to call myself. I was so uncomfortable in my own skin, was so sure no one would believe it was just one person making the music (This was like ten years ago when there weren't as many bedroom pop artists), wanted to incite the idea that it was a band, so I named it Computer Magic. I wanted to detract the attention from myself. The music I thought was great, but I didn't think I was great, so I needed that separation. Sad really when you think about it."

In 2010, Johnson returned to New York City and she worked retail and restaurants again, but this time making music on the side. She started releasing her own songs as free download on her sites zDanz and TheComputerMagic and compiled those songs on various EPs: Hiding From Our Time (2010), Hiding From More of Our Time (2010), Electronic Fences (2011), Get a Job (2011), Spectronic (2011), Orion (2012, released through Kitsune), A Million Years / Another Science (2013), Extra Stuff (2014), Dreams of Better Days (2015).

In 2011, Computer Magic contributed with a cover of the song "Take It or Leave It" by The Strokes for the Stereogum-curated cover album Stereogum Presents... Stroked: A Tribute to Is This It. In the same year she was featured on New Band of the Week on The Guardian and on the Radar Tip of the Day column on NME.

Her debut studio album, Davos, was released on October 16, 2015. Johnson wrote all songs of this album, except "All Day" credited to her, Brian Robertson and Brian Hancock III. Most of the production, engineering and mixing has been done by Atomic Heart Studios in New York, NY by Claudius Mittendorfer. The title Davos is a homage to a now-decrepit ski resort where Johnson grew up in upstate New York, where her father worked and still resides, although the ski resort closed when Johnson was 3 years old. 3 music videos were released to promote this album: "Be Fair" (filmed in Trona Pinnacles), "Hudson", and "Fuzz".

On October 7, 2016, Johnson released the 5-songs EP Obscure but Visible. She mentioned on Stereogum: "I wrote the Obscure but Visible EP upstate this past Spring / Summer. I think the general feeling for the EP was an open one. In a way, I wanted it to feel lighthearted. I tried to showcase a few different songwriting styles of what I do, too." She made music videos for 4 songs from this EP: "Dimensions", "Gone for the Weekend", "Lonely Like We Are", and "Been Waiting".

In 2017, Johnson and the musician Cody Crump collaborated on a side project called Cody & Danz. They released the EP Only the Hits on July 14, 2017, by Channel 9 Records digitally and on a limited edition cassette. They made music videos for the songs "Make It in America" and "So Small". On December 15, 2017, Johnson released the compilation Super Rare which included early tracks, Japan exclusives and rarities.

On February 23, 2018, Computer Magic released her second album, Danz, titled after her nickname. According to her, this album is her most personal out of any other record she made. She drew inspiration from her life and characters from films or books. Danz was supported by four music videos: "Amnesia", "Ordinary Life (Message from an A.I. Girlfriend)" (with a concept by Johnson and the director Anise Mariko), "Perfect Game", and "Clouds".

On March 20, 2020, Johnson released the compilation COVERS 2010–20 which consists of 6 cover versions of songs by No Doubt, Mac DeMarco, Sun Ra, Mark James (famously performed by Elvis Presley), Julee Cruise, and Raf (famously covered by Laura Branigan).

Career as Danz CM (2020–present) 
In August 2020, Johnson announced on W Magazine that she had changed her alias from Computer Magic to Danz CM. Discussing on her official Facebook page the reasons of the moniker change, she mentioned: "I wanted to change it because I outgrew Computer Magic. I outgrew the shy bedroom pop girl a long time ago. Computer Magic might mean something different to you, but to me it represents a skin that I need to shed. So if Charmander is like Computer Magic, Charizard is Danz CM. I kept the CM in there. I hope that makes the change easier. It's not a rebranding it is just me growing."

Her third studio album, The Absurdity of Human Existence, was released on March 12, 2021. Danz wrote, produced and recorded the album, Claudius Mittendorfer mixed it and Joe Laporta mastered it. Speaking about the album, Danz said that she went through an existential crisis: she experienced feelings of self-doubt, went through an extreme low, was about to break and contemplated the human existence. All that inspired her to write "songs of sadness, songs about falling in love, songs about death, songs about wanting something more out of life." According to her: "it was diving both the deepest I could go emotionally meanwhile perfecting every sound – listening repeatedly to every second, making sure it was perfect and pushing myself."

The first single and music video (filmed in Death Valley) from Absurdity, "Idea of You", was premiered on YouTube on December 11, 2020. The next single, "Domino", was released on January 22, 2021, followed by "Something More" on February 12, and "I Don't Need a Hero" on March 5.

Other projects

Commercial work 
Johnson has composed numerous songs for commercials in Japan for companies such as Panasonic, Body Mainte, and two separate commercials for QP Half and QP Sesame Dressing.

Her song "Running (Hiding Version)", was used in two separate television commercials for Aria Resort and Casino and Lexus.

She has modeled clothes for Sofia Coppola's Japanese clothing company Milkfed, and in 2017 was in the fall catalog for the skate clothing brand X-Girl, founded by Sonic Youth's Kim Gordon in the 1990s.

In 2020, Danz made the soundtrack for the documentary The Map about the a major redesign of the New York City subway map.

Channel 9 Records 
In 2015, Johnson started her own New York based record label, Channel 9 Records, to release merchandise and her own music on limited edition vinyls and cassettes. She originally funded the label with music licensing.

Synth History 
In 2020, Johnson founded the media brand Synth History after the success of her Instagram page of the same name. The brand consists of a website and independently published magazine that features curated interviews with various pioneering and contemporary electronic music artists like John Carpenter, Trent Reznor of Nine Inch Nails, Fatboy Slim, Oneohtrix Point Never, James Murphy of LCD Soundsystem, Vince Clarke of Depeche Mode and Yazoo, Rick Wakeman of Yes, Suzanne Ciani, Pete Townshend of The Who, Chromeo, Gary Numan and others.  The brand also encompasses Spotify playlists and a limited narrative podcast series. The first episode was released in August 2020 on musician and composer Wendy Carlos and the second was released in March 2022 on Roland founder Ikutaro Kakehashi.

Style and influences 

Danielle Johnson sings, writes, produces, and records her own music, described as "spacy, sci-fi-influenced synth pop" by Allmusic and "as otherworldly cosmic pop" by The FADER. She has maintained success in Japan and has gained a cult following in the United States. Attracting science fiction enthusiasts, she often performs or takes press photos in space suits with backdrops reminiscent of NASA base camps.

Danz is a self-described synthesizer nerd. In 2018, she was featured in the artist spotlight by Dave Smith and Sequential for using the Prophet 6 analog desktop synthesizer module. In 2020, she featured on the Moog site for using a Moog Subsequent 25 analog synthesizer to craft an instrumental piece.

Danz grew up listening to Radiohead, Belle & Sebastian, and Ladytron. She considered Paul McCartney, Trent Reznor, David Bowie, and Thom Yorke as the main songwriters she looked up to. Her musical influences also include Gary Numan, Broadcast, New Order, Giorgio Moroder, Stereolab, Can, Herbie Hancock, and music genres such as New Wave, Italo Disco, Krautrock. She also lists the science fiction author Philip K. Dick, and the science fiction films Barbarella, Logan's Run and 2001: A Space Odyssey as further influences.

Popularity in Japan 
Johnson has a devoted and avid following in Japan. The music video for "Lonely Like We Are", which presents images from one of her tours in Japan, was dedicated to her Japanese fans and labels. She released 6 albums in Japan with Tugboat Records and P-Vine Records. Many of the Japanese versions include bonus tracks specifically for that territory. Her first Japanese release, Scientific Experience, debuted at #5 on the iTunes Japanese Electronic Music Chart. Her 2015 release Mindstate debuted at No. 1 on the iTunes Japanese Electronic Music Chart.

Discography

Studio albums 
 Computer Magic – Davos (2015)
 Computer Magic – Danz (2018)
 Danz CM – The Absurdity of Human Existence (2021)

EPs 
 Computer Magic – Spectro (2010)
 Computer Magic – Hiding From Our Time (2010)
 Computer Magic – Hiding From More of Our Time (2010)
 Computer Magic – Electronic Fences (2011) [vinyl + digital]
 Computer Magic – Get a Job (2011)
 Computer Magic – Spectronic (2011)
 Computer Magic – Orion (2012)
 Computer Magic – A Million Years / Another Science (2013) [vinyl + digital]
 Computer Magic – Extra Stuff (2014) [vinyl + digital]
 Computer Magic – Dreams of Better Days (2015)
 Computer Magic – Obscure but Visible (2016) [vinyl + digital + CD]
 Cody & Danz – Just the Hits (2017)

Compilations 
 Computer Magic – Super Rare (2017)
 Computer Magic – COVERS 2010–20 (2020)

Japan edition albums 
 Computer Magic – Scientific Experience (2012)
 Computer Magic – Phonetics (2013)
 Computer Magic – Mindstate (2015)
 Computer Magic – Davos (Japan Edition) (2015)
 Computer Magic – Danz (Japan Edition) (2018)
 Computer Magic – Super Rare (Japan Edition) (2018)

Collaborations 
 AAAMYYY feat. Computer Magic – "Z"
 Futurecop! feat. Computer Magic – "Star"
 Le Matos feat. Computer Magic – "Cold Summer"
 Le Matos feat. Computer Magic – "The Sounds of Nora"

Remixes 
 BRONCHO – "Boys Got to Go" (Computer Magic Remix)
 Cody Crump – "Friendzone" (Computer Magic Remix)

Music videos 
 Computer Magic – "Shopping for My Robot" (2010)
 Computer Magic – "The End of Time" (2011)
 Computer Magic – "Running" (2011)
 Computer Magic – "Trinity" (2012)
 Computer Magic – "A Million Years" (2013)
 Computer Magic – "Moving Forward" (2013)
 Computer Magic – "Dreaming" (2014)
 Computer Magic – "All I Ever Wanted" (2014)
 Computer Magic – "Mindstate" (2015)
 Computer Magic – "Be Fair" (2015)
 Computer Magic – "Hudson" (2015)
 Computer Magic – "Fuzz" (2016)
 Computer Magic – "Dimensions" (2016)
 Computer Magic – "Gone for the Weekend" (2016)
 Computer Magic – "Lonely Like We Are" (2016)
 Computer Magic – "Been Waiting" (2017)
 Cody & Danz – "Make It in America" (2017)
 Cody & Danz – "So Small" (2017)
 Computer Magic – "Ordinary Life (Message From an A.I. Girlfriend)" (2018)
 Computer Magic – "Amnesia" (2018)
 Computer Magic – "Clouds" (2018)
 Computer Magic – "Perfect Game" (2018)
 Computer Magic – "Suspicious Minds" (2019)
 Computer Magic – "Dreams of Better Days (Don't Pass Me By)" (2020)
 Danz CM – "Idea of You" (2020)
 Danz CM – "Domino" (2020)
 Danz CM – "Something More" (2022)

References

External links
 Official site
 Synth History
 Channel 9 Records

1989 births
Living people
American electronic musicians
American synth-pop musicians
Record producers from New York (state)
American women record producers
American women singer-songwriters
People from the Catskills
American women in electronic music
Ableton Live users
21st-century American women